The Cornwall League 2 1992–93 was a full season of rugby union within Cornwall League 2.

Table

Points are awarded as follows:
 2 points for a win
 1 points for a draw
 0 points for a loss

References

External links

 Trelawney's Army Cornwall rugby website

1992–93 in English rugby union
Cornwall League 2
1990s in Cornwall